Maung Myint,aka Ye Myint is a Burmese politician and incumbent Pyithu Hluttaw member of parliament for Mingin Township. He previously served as Minister for Industry of Myanmar. He was appointed to the post by President Thein Sein in July 2013 as a result of a cabinet reshuffle. Maung Myint contested the 2010 Burmese general election, winning a seat in the Pyithu Hluttaw to represent Thongwa Township constituency. He served as Deputy Minister for Foreign Affairs from March 2011 to September 2012, and as Minister for Labor from September 2012 to July 2013.

Maung Myint was born on 21 May 1958 in Mingin, Sagaing Region, Burma but grew up in Homalin, Sagaing Region. He is married to Khin Mya Win.

References

1958 births
People from Mandalay
Living people
Government ministers of Myanmar